Callville may refer to:

 Callville Bay, Nevada
 Callville, Nevada, US; a former settlement, now submerged under Lake Mead